The Okinawa Marine was the weekly publication produced by the United States Marine Corps public affairs office headquartered at Camp Butler, Okinawa Prefecture, Japan and distributed free to all military bases in Okinawa.  It provided information on U.S. facilities and activities in and around Okinawa Island. The newspaper included area guide, living information, weather, and public affairs. The final edition was published on Feb 28, 2014.

References

http://issuu.com/okinawamarine/docs/20140228lowlinks

United States Armed Forces in Okinawa Prefecture
Weekly newspapers published in Japan
Works about the United States Marine Corps
Publications with year of establishment missing
Publications disestablished in 2014